North Broadway Historic District or North Broadway may refer to:

in the United States
(by state)
North Broadway Historic District (Leavenworth, Kansas), listed on the NRHP in Kansas
North Broadway-Short Street Historic District, Lexington, Kentucky, listed on the NRHP in Kentucky
North Broadway Historic District (Tupelo, Mississippi), listed on the NRHP in Mississippi
East North Broadway Historic District, Clintonville, Columbus, Ohio
North Broadway Historic District (Lebanon, Ohio), listed on the NRHP in Ohio
North Broadway Street Historic District, De Pere, Wisconsin, listed on the NRHP in Wisconsin